Blood pudding may refer to: 

Black pudding, a blood sausage with a high proportion of oat or barley
Blood sausage
Pig blood curd, solidified pig's blood
Sanguinaccio dolce, an Italian dessert made from pig's blood
Tiết canh, a North Vietnamese blood pudding